The 2005 British Speedway Championship was the 45th edition of the British Speedway Championship. The Final took place on 10 July at Oxford Stadium in Oxford, England. The Championship was won by Scott Nicholls, who beat Chris Harris, Joe Screen and Mark Loram in the final heat.

Final 
10 July 2005
 Oxford Stadium, Oxford

{| width=100%
|width=50% valign=top|

Qualifying

Final

See also 
 British Speedway Championship

References 

British Speedway Championship
Great Britain